Frans Verbeeck (born 13 June 1941) is a Belgian former road bicycle racer.

Palmarès

1969
1st, Grote Prijs Jef Scherens
1970
1st, Grote Prijs Jef Scherens
1st, Omloop Het Volk
1st, Stage 1a, Tour of Belgium
1st, Overall, Tour de l'Oise
1st, Stage 2
1st, Stage 1, Tour de Luxembourg
1971
1st, Amstel Gold Race
1st, Grote Prijs Jef Scherens
1st, Leeuwse Pijl
1st, Stage 1 and 5, Four Days of Dunkirk
1st, Stage 1, 3, 4 and 5, Tour de Luxembourg
1972
1st, GP Frans Verbeeck
1st, Leeuwse Pijl
1st, Omloop Het Volk
1st, Tour du Haut-Var
1st, Stage 2, Critérium du Dauphiné Libéré
1st, Stage 3 and 5a, Tour of Belgium
1973
 National Road Race Championship
1st, Stage 1, Critérium du Dauphiné Libéré
1st, Stage 2, Four Days of Dunkirk
1st, Stage 4, Tirreno–Adriatico
1st, Stage 2a (TTT), Tour de France
1974
1st, La Flèche Wallonne
1st, Grand Prix de Wallonie
1st, GP Frans Verbeeck
1st, Prologue, Tour of Belgium
1st, Stage 3, Tour de Luxembourg
1975
1st, E3 Prijs Vlaanderen
1st, GP Frans Verbeeck
1st, Prologue A, Ronde van Nederland
1st, Overall, Tour de Luxembourg
1st, Prologue
1976
1st, GP Frans Verbeeck
1st, Grote Prijs Jef Scherens
1st, Tour du Haut-Var
1st, Overall, Tour de Luxembourg
1st, Stages 1 and 2
1st, Stage 3, Tour Méditerranéen
1977
1st, Brabantse Pijl
1st, Druivenkoers Overijse

External links

 
 
Brief history of his racing career

Belgian male cyclists
Cyclists from Flemish Brabant
1941 births
Living people
People from Aarschot